Clearview School Division No. 71 or Clearview Public Schools is a public school authority within the Canadian province of Alberta operated out of Stettler.

See also 
List of school authorities in Alberta

References

External links 

 
School districts in Alberta